The Blue Line (officially the UC San Diego Blue Line for sponsorship purposes) is a  light rail line in the San Diego Trolley system, operated by San Diego Trolley, Inc., an operating division of the San Diego Metropolitan Transit System (MTS). The line serves La Jolla, Downtown San Diego, National City, Chula Vista, and San Ysidro.

The line is one of four lines in the Trolley system, the others include the Green, Orange, and Silver lines. The Blue Line has the highest ridership of the San Diego Trolley's three regular lines, transporting 15,094,878 riders during FY 2014 and 16,532,209 riders during FY 2015, according to the MTS. It is named due to a $30 million naming rights deal with UC San Diego Health. An extension to its namesake campus of the University of California, San Diego, as well as nine other stations, opened to revenue service on November 21, 2021.

History

The initial line in the San Diego Trolley system, the Blue Line first opened between Centre City San Diego and San Ysidro on July 26, 1981, at a cost of $86 million (equivalent to $ million in ), using the existing tracks of the San Diego and Arizona Eastern Railway. In 1986, the line was named the South Line to differentiate it from the new East Line to Euclid Avenue, which later became the Orange Line. On July 2, 1992, the line was extended north from downtown with the opening of the County Center/Little Italy stop. It was renamed the North-South Line when the Old Town extension opened on June 16, 1996. The North-South Line was renamed the Blue Line in 1997, with the opening of the extension to Mission San Diego on November 23, 1997.

When the Green Line was brought into service in 2005, the Blue Line was cut back to the Old Town Transit Center. At rush hours, however, some Blue Line trains continued onto Qualcomm Stadium; and from Qualcomm Stadium onto San Ysidro.  On September 3, 2006, the rush hour service Blue line trains were discontinued entirely, due to duplication of service with Green Line service. All Blue Line trains then terminated at Old Town. Rush hour Blue Line trains operated from San Ysidro to America Plaza with some serving the Bayside.

Blue Line service also experienced some change in the stations served. The San Diego Square station located between 7th and 8th Avenues in Downtown closed in 1986 due to low ridership and its close proximity to Fifth Avenue station. Later that year, the Bayfront/E Street station in Chula Vista opened in October 1986, about five years after service already operated along the tracks served.  At the same time, the Centre City station on C Street, between Sixth Avenue and Fifth Avenue, was renamed the Fifth Avenue station.  The Fenton Parkway stop was an 'infill' station that opened in 2000; however, it is now only served by the Green Line.

2012 realignment

During a system redesign which took effect on September 2, 2012, Blue Line service between America Plaza and Old Town was discontinued, making America Plaza the Blue Line's northern terminus. Blue Line trains traveled between America Plaza to San Ysidro on a regular 15 minute frequency, with a  minute frequency during weekday rush hours.  Blue Line service to Old Town was reinstated once the Mid-Coast trolley extension to UC San Diego was completed. UC San Diego Health paid $30 million to rename the route the UC San Diego Blue Line in 2015.

Trolley Renewal Project

To accommodate the new Siemens S70 models and allow for their use on the line, the Blue Line stations needed to undergo renovation, although this was done over a period of five years to prevent the disruption of operation of the Trolley. The project to renovate the stations, called the Trolley Renewal Project, began in fall 2010. After beginning operation on the Green Line in 2011 and on the Orange Line in 2013, low-floor Siemens S70 LRVs began operation on the Blue Line on January 27, 2015. Renovation of rail track and the final eleven Blue Line stations was completed in late 2015.

Mid-Coast extension

The Mid-Coast Corridor Transit Project is an  extension of the Blue Line from the Old Town Transit Center north to La Jolla Village, University of California, San Diego and University City. Ridership is projected at 34,700 trips in 2030. The extension primarily follows the right-of-way of the Coaster and Interstate 5, with an elevated deviation around the UCSD area. MTS estimated construction costs of $2.1 billion. An aim of the extension is to decrease demand for parking on the UCSD campus while providing direct trolley access to Westfield UTC, a popular shopping mall. The existing SuperLoop BRT Shuttle (Routes 201/202) provides transit in and around the UTC area from the nearby Trolley stations. Testing of the line began in June 2021, and it opened to revenue service on November 21, 2021.

The Mid-Coast Corridor Transit Project was done in conjunction with the North Coast Corridor project, which upgrades the LOSSAN Corridor further to the north. Both projects build upon the original right-of-way of the Surf Line, which was built in the 1880s as the original railway from Los Angeles to San Diego.

Stations

Gallery

References

 
San Diego Trolley lines
South Bay (San Diego County)
Railway lines opened in 1981
1981 establishments in California